African Church, also known as the A.M.E. Church of St. Charles, is a historic African Methodist Episcopal church located at 554 Madison Street in St. Charles, St. Charles County, Missouri. It was built about 1855, and is a small brick building with a low-pitched gable roof.  The building was renovated in 1947 as a residence.

It was added to the National Register of Historic Places in 1980. It is located in the Midtown Neighborhood Historic District.

References

Individually listed contributing properties to historic districts on the National Register in Missouri
African-American history of Missouri
African Methodist Episcopal churches in Missouri
Churches completed in 1855
Churches on the National Register of Historic Places in Missouri
Buildings and structures in St. Charles County, Missouri
National Register of Historic Places in St. Charles County, Missouri